The Sunway BlueLight is a Chinese massively parallel supercomputer. It is the first publicly announced PFLOPS supercomputer using Sunway processors solely developed by the People's Republic of China.

It ranked #2 in the 2011 China HPC Top100, #14 on the November 2011 TOP500 list, and #39 on the November 2011 Green500 List. The machine was installed at National Supercomputing Jǐnán Center in September 2011 and was developed by National Parallel Computer Engineering Technology Research Center and supported by Technology Department 863 project. The water-cooled 9-rack system has 8704 ShenWei SW1600 processors (For the Top100 run 8575 CPUs were used, at 975 MHz each) organized as 34 super nodes (each consisting of 256 compute nodes), 150 TB main memory, 2 PB external storage, peak performance of 1.07016 PFLOPS, sustained performance of 795.9 TFLOPS, LINPACK efficiency 74.37%, and total power consumption 1074 kW.

The Sunway BlueLight is ranked 103rd  (ranked highest at 14th when it appeared on the list in November 2011; then 65th in the November 2014)

See also 
 Sunway TaihuLight
 Top500

References 

2011 in technology
Supercomputers
Supercomputing in China